Henry Lloyd may refer to:

Henry Lloyd (governor) (1852–1920), governor of Maryland
Henry Lloyd (soldier) (c. 1718–1783), Welsh army officer and military writer
Henry Demarest Lloyd (1847–1903), American journalist
Henry J. Lloyd (1794–1853), English amateur cricketer
Henry Lloyd (priest) (1911–2001), English Anglican priest

See also
Henri Lloyd, clothing retailer
John Henry Lloyd (1884–1964), Negro league baseball player